The Jordan 191 was a Formula One car designed by Gary Anderson for use by Jordan Grand Prix in its debut season in 1991. Its best finish was in Canada and Mexico, where Andrea de Cesaris drove it to fourth place at both races. Driving the 191 at the 1991 Hungarian Grand Prix, Bertrand Gachot took the fastest lap of the race.

Background
Eddie Jordan was an Irishman who had achieved some success in British Formula 3 as a driver until he recognised he had reached the peak of his career and then set up a racing team. His team, Eddie Jordan Racing (EJR), ran initially in Formula Ford and steadily progressed through the motorsport tiers. In 1988 EJR ran a pair of F3000 cars for Johnny Herbert and Martin Donnelly and the following year won the F3000 championship with Jean Alesi.

Jordan then established Jordan Grand Prix with a view to entering Formula One and hired Gary Anderson to design his team's first Formula One chassis. Anderson had previously worked for Reynard and had designed that manufacturer's F3000 car. He would carry out design work on what was eventually designated the 191 in between F3000 racing weekends, during which he would engineer EJR's F3000 race cars.

Design and development
Anderson was the leader of a team of three that were involved in the design of the 191 car; Andrew Green worked on the suspension, Mark Smith did the gearbox and this left Anderson the task of the bodywork and aerodynamics. The car had a tidy form with a raised nose and a drooping rear diffuser. Originally designed for the Judd V8, the 191 ended up being powered by a Cosworth-Ford HB V8 engine, Jordan having arranged a customer supply after fortuitously making contact with a senior executive at Cosworth.

On the sponsorship front, after failed negotiations with the cigarette brand Camel that had sponsored Jordan's F3000 team, Jordan signed 7 Up, a soft drink company, as the team's major sponsor. The 7 Up corporate colour was green and this tied in with that of the Japanese camera film company Fuji. After Eddie Jordan approached the company, terms were agreed and Fuji also joined as a sponsor.

By November 1990, the 191 was complete and its first test run was conducted by John Watson at the Silverstone circuit. The initial feedback was relatively favourable and further testing was completed at the Paul Ricard circuit in France. The team's drivers had been selected; they were to be the experienced Italian Andrea de Cesaris and Belgian Bertrand Gachot.

A total of seven 191 chassis were built across the year; one was destroyed in an accident at the British Grand Prix.

Racing history
Due to the number of teams taking part in the 1991 Formula One season, Jordan had to complete pre-qualifying at the start of each race weekend in order to be allowed entry into qualifying proper. A total of eight cars were entered for pre-qualifying, with the four fastest continuing onto qualifying.

At the opening round of the season in Phoenix, de Cesaris failed to pre-qualify, blighted by engine problems. Gachot however, sailed through and comfortably qualified 14th for the race itself. Engine failure ended Gachot's race on lap 75 and he was classified tenth, having run as high as seventh at one stage of the race.

Both drivers made the grid comfortably at the following Brazilian Grand Prix, Gachot in tenth and de Cesaris in 13th. Gachot was again not running at the finish but had completed enough laps to be classified in 13th while de Cesaris retired, having had an accident. Both drivers retired from the San Marino Grand Prix but at the next race, in Montreal, de Cesaris scored the team's best finish of the season, with a fourth place. He was followed home by the fifth-placed Gachot, earning Jordan its first points of the year.

At the following race in Mexico City, de Cesaris again finished fourth, having qualified in 11th place. Gachot started from 20th on the grid but had worked his way up to fifth place when he spun off the circuit. He also retired from the next race, the French Grand Prix, spinning out on the first lap having qualified 19th. De Cesaris, from 13th on the grid, went on to finish sixth in the race, adding another point to Jordan's total. By the German Grand Prix, the number of points scored by de Cesaris and Gachot meant that Jordan were not required to pre-qualify for the remainder of the season.

After the Hungarian race, Gachot's season was curtailed by a two-month prison sentence, for spraying CS gas at a taxi driver in London. Over the final six races, three drivers filled in for Gachot - Michael Schumacher, Roberto Moreno and Alessandro Zanardi. Schumacher was a revelation in his one and only race weekend for Jordan. At the 1991 Belgian Grand Prix, Schumacher qualified a superb seventh on the grid (Jordan's joint-best ever at that time), outqualifying de Cesaris who was eleventh. However, the high did not last, as the clutch failed within the first mile of the race. Having made his way into second place by the final stages of the race, De Cesaris also retired, within a few laps of the finish, and was eventually classified in 13th.

Prior to the next race in Italy, a legal wrangle between Benetton and Jordan developed, with Schumacher signing for Benetton - a team with which he would later win two world championships. This sent Moreno packing from Benetton and Jordan signed him up as a replacement. Moreno did two races, in Italy and Portugal, achieving little, before Jordan handed a novice, Zanardi, his debut in the final three races. He completed a pair of ninth-place finishes intervened with a retirement.

Summary and legacy
In their first season, Jordan finished fifth in the Constructors' Championship, scoring 13 points with the 191. De Cesaris was ninth in the Drivers' Championship with nine points while Gachot's four points earned him a share of 12th.

The 191 is considered by many to be one of the most beautiful Formula 1 cars of all time. The car won the Autosport Racing Car of the Year award for 1991.

In popular culture
The Jordan 191 was featured in the Codemasters F1 2020 video game as a DLC for the "Deluxe Schumacher Edition".

Complete Formula One results
(key) (results in italics indicate fastest lap)

Notes
Footnotes

Citations

References

Jordan Formula One cars